Krister Hammarbergh (born 1963) is a Swedish politician of the Moderate Party. He was member of the Riksdag representing Norrbotten County from 2004 to 2018. In 2010, he was appointed the Moderate Party's Chairman in the Riksdag Justice Committee. Before his election to the Riksdag, he was an opposition politician in Luleå Municipality.

References 

Members of the Riksdag from the Moderate Party
Living people
1963 births
Members of the Riksdag 2002–2006